Little Hands (Original title (FR): Les Petites Mains) is a Live Action short film directed by Rémi Allier and produced by Wrong Men & Films Grand Huit, winner of the César Award for Best Short Film at the French Motion Picture César Academy. The short film has been presented and won awards in a number of festivals including Brussels Short Film Festival and the Magritte Award where it was nominated for "Best Short Film" (Meilleur court métrage).

Plot 

Upon discovering that the management is closing down the factory, a desperate employee kidnaps the toddler of the director in order to negotiate.

Awards 

Since its launch, the film has received numerous awards, and selected in more than 150 festivals around the world.

The short was part of the Oscar predictive world touring screening The animation Showcase 2019 (Live Action Screenings).

References

External links 

 
 
 

2017 short films
2010s French-language films
French drama short films
2010s French films